Domna can refer to:
 Domna, Republic of Buryatia, a selo (village) in Sosnovo-Ozersky Selsoviet of Yeravninsky District of the Republic of Buryatia, Russia
 Domna, Zabaykalsky Krai, a selo in Chitinsky District of Zabaykalsky Krai, Russia
 Domna (air base), air base in Zabaykalsky Krai, Russia

Names

 , Latin name
 Julia Domna (d. 217), Roman empress
 Domna Visvizi (1783–1850), Greek revolutionary
 Domna Anisimova (1815–1877), Russian poet
Domna Michailidou, Greek economist
 Domna Samiou (1928–2012), Greek musician

Other

 Domna, crater on Vesta, see List of geological features on Vesta